Chase High School is a coeducational secondary school and sixth form, located in Westcliff-on-Sea, Essex, England.

History
The school opened in 2006 on the site of the former Prittlewell Technology College, and opened a new extension in April 2009, which included dance and drama studios, an independent learning centre and a cafeteria which features fingerprint recognition for students making purchases.

The school grounds cover over 10 acres of land, and contain three main buildings. A new sixth form block has recently been built, which includes up-to-date vocational education facilities and resources including hairdressing and beauty therapy, alongside an up-to-date registration swipe system and modern fitness suite.

The school converted to academy status in September 2015.

Sports facilities
The school has a small playing field that is marked during the winter and spring term with a rugby pitch, and an athletics track during the summer term. There is a large outside hard-surface area that holds 5 tennis courts and 4 netball courts, and a multi-use indoor sports hall marked for one 5-a-side football court, one basketball court, four badminton courts, one volleyball court and two cricket nets.

The school also has a partnership with PlayFootball Southend; this is a brand-new £2m, purpose-built football venue that opened in 2007.

There are 8 outdoor floodlit 5-a-side pitches and a full-size training pitch that can also be split into 4x 7-a-side or 2x 9-a-side pitches, all equipped with an artificial 3rd generation, rubber crumb cushioned compound surface. The same surface is used by Liverpool, Real Madrid and Bayern Munich's training academies.

Results
According to BBC figures, the school has performed relatively poorly in comparison with local and national averages in GCSE examinations previously, however this has improved constantly and consistently with 76% of all students gaining five or more A*-C grades at GCSE level in 2010, which is a significant increase compared to 51% achieved in 2009. 37% of students also achieved five or more passes at grade A*-C including English and Mathematics. Additionally, 94% of students achieved 5 or more A* to G grades which will see many of the students returning to Chase High Sixth Form to continue their studies.

Chase High School 2010 GCSE Results

Ofsted 2011
An Ofsted 2010—11 subject survey inspection on citizenship throughout the school with the evidence used to inform judgement's made included: interviews with students and staff; scrutiny of relevant documentation; analysis of students’ work; and observation of lessons. led to the inspector (Tony Gallagher) finding and stating that:

"the overall effectiveness of citizenship is good."

"Achievement in citizenship is good"

"The quality of teaching in citizenship is good"

"Leadership and management in citizenship are good"

References

External links
 

Secondary schools in Southend-on-Sea
Academies in Southend-on-Sea
Educational institutions established in 2006
2006 establishments in England